Giovanni Trapattoni (born 17 March 1939), sometimes popularly known as "Trap" or "Il Trap", is an Italian football manager and former player, considered the most successful club coach of Italian football. A former defensive midfielder, as a player he spent almost his entire club career with AC Milan, where he won two Serie A league titles (1961–62 and 1967–68), and two European Cups, in 1962–63 and 1968–69. Internationally, he played for Italy, earning 17 caps and being part of the squad at the 1962 FIFA World Cup in Chile.

One of the most celebrated managers in football history, Trapattoni is one of only five coaches, alongside Carlo Ancelotti, Ernst Happel, José Mourinho and Tomislav Ivić to have won league titles in four different European countries; in total, Trapattoni has won 10 league titles in Italy, Germany, Portugal and Austria. Alongside Udo Lattek and José Mourinho, he is one of the three coaches to have won all three major European club competitions (European Cup, UEFA Cup, UEFA Cup Winners' Cup) and the only one to make it with the same club (Juventus). Also, he is the only one to have won all official continental club competitions and the world title, achieving this with Juventus during his first spell with the club. He is one of the rare few to have won the European Cup, the Cup Winners' Cup and Intercontinental Cup as both a player and manager.

Regarded as the most famous and consistent disciple of Nereo Rocco, Trapattoni coached his native Italy national team to the 2002 FIFA World Cup and UEFA Euro 2004, but could not replicate his club successes with Italy, suffering a controversial early exit in both competitions. Trapattoni was most recently the manager of the Republic of Ireland national football team. He led them to their first European Championships in 24 years, enjoying a successful UEFA Euro 2012 qualifying campaign. This followed narrowly missing out on the 2010 FIFA World Cup, after his team were controversially knocked out by France.

Club career

Born in Cusano Milanino near Milan, Trapattoni had a successful career as a player with AC Milan, playing either as a central defender or as a defensive midfielder with the main task of passing the ball to more creative players such as Giovanni Lodetti and Gianni Rivera. He won two Serie A titles (1961–1962, 1967–1968) and two European Cups (1962–1963, 1968–1969) during his time with Milan, and was one of the stars of the 1963 European Cup Final against Benfica, successfully man-marking Eusébio in the second half. Similarly, in the team's 4–1 victory in the 1969 European Cup Final against Ajax, he drew praise in the Italian media for his defending and ability to nullify the offensive threat of Johann Cruyff.

After taking a break from the national team, Trapattoni thought he could settle with a mid-table team for one last season instead of being at one club all his life, subsequently moving to Varese and, after a successful season with them, retired from professional football and embarked on a highly successful managerial career two years later.

International career

Trapattoni also played for the Italy national football team between 1960 and 1964, earning 17 caps and scoring 1 goal. Most notably, he was part of the squad at the 1962 FIFA World Cup in Chile, although he was unable to play any matches during the tournament after sustaining an injury. He was also part of Italy's squad at the 1960 Summer Olympics.

Trapattoni is also remembered for his performance in Italy's 3–0 friendly victory over Brazil at the San Siro stadium in Milan on 12 May 1963; during the match, he was able to nullify Pelé's impact on the game through his man-marking ability, with the latter asking to be substituted for Quarentinha in the 26th minute of the second half, whom Trapattoni also successfully defended. However, Pelé later stated in 2000 that his performance was due to stomach pains, and that he was forced to play due to contractual obligations; Trapattoni himself also frequently downplayed Pelé's performance during the match, even prior to Pelé's comments, stating: "the truth is that on that day he was half-injured. Tired. I was a good footballer, but let's leave Pelé alone. He was a martian."

Style of play
A talented defensive-minded player, Trapattoni was capable of playing both in defence, as a centre-back, and in midfield, as a defensive midfielder, due to his work-rate and ability to win back possession and subsequently distribute the ball forward to his more offensive-minded teammates. Above all, he was known for his excellent man-marking skills.

Coaching career

1974–1986: Early career at AC Milan and Juventus
Trapattoni began coaching at Milan as a youth team coach, before becoming caretaker coach. Trapattoni was caretaker coach from 9 April 1974 to 30 June 1974. His first match was the 1973–74 European Cup Winners' Cup semi–final first leg against Borussia Mönchengladbach. Milan won the match 2–0. They got to the final after only losing the second leg 1–0. Milan lost the final 2–0 to East German club 1. FC Magdeburg. Milan finished seventh in Serie A. He was appointed first team coach in 1975.

Trapattoni was head coach for Juventus for ten consecutive years, from 1 July 1976 to 30 June 1986. Trapattoni won all UEFA club competitions (a European record).

He won the Serie A league title six times (1976–77, 1977–78, 1980–81, 1981–82, 1983–84, 1985–86), the Coppa Italia twice (1978–79 and 1982–83), the European Cup in 1984–85, the Intercontinental Cup in 1985, the UEFA Cup Winners' Cup in 1983–84, the European Super Cup in 1984, and the UEFA Cup in 1976–77.

Apart from winning the European Cup in 1984–85, Trapattoni came close to conquering the trophy on another occasion, in 1982–83, but Juventus suffered a surprising defeat at the hands of Hamburg in the Athens final, finishing as runners-up.

During his years managing Juventus, Trapattoni established himself as one of the best managers in football history, well-known and respected among fans and journalists throughout Europe. He was renowned for combining expert man-management with almost unmatched tactical knowledge.

1986–1994: Inter Milan and return to Juventus
Trapattoni coached Inter Milan from 1 July 1986 to 30 June 1991. While in charge of Inter, he won the Serie A in 1988–89, the Supercoppa Italiana in 1989 and the UEFA Cup in 1990–91.

He then managed Juventus for a second time between 1991 and 1994, winning the UEFA Cup in 1992–93.

1994–1996: Bayern Munich, return to Serie A 
Trapattoni became coach of Bayern Munich in the summer of 1994, after the end of his second spell with Juventus. However, he left at the end of the 1994–95 season.

Trapattoni coached Cagliari in the 1995–96 season. His first match was a 1–0 loss to Udinese on 26 August 1995. The club's board of directors decided to dismiss him in February 1996, after a string of bad results; Trapattoni was thus fired for the first time in his career. His final match was a 4–1 loss to Juventus. Cagliari were in 13th place at the time of his sacking.

1996–2000: Back to Bayern Munich and Fiorentina
Trapattoni returned to manage Bayern again in July 1996. He is well remembered by German fans for an emotional outburst in broken German during a press conference on 10 March 1998 (" [...] " [German uses the verb  ('to be') and not  ('to have') to express "I have finished"/"I am done"] − "How dare Strunz? [...] I have finished!") where he criticised the attitude of Mehmet Scholl and Mario Basler ("" − "These players were weak like a bottle empty!"). In a 2011 interview, Trapattoni himself explained his famous outburst thus:

As Bayern manager Trapattoni won the German Bundesliga in 1996–97, the German Cup (DFB-Pokal) in 1997–98 and the German League Cup (DFB-Ligapokal) in 1997. He left Bayern at the end of the 1997–98 season and was replaced by Ottmar Hitzfeld.

Trapattoni coached Fiorentina from 1998 to 2000. With Trapattoni's expert guidance, Fiorentina made a serious challenge for the title in 1998–99, finishing the season in 3rd place, which earned them qualification to the Champions League, also reaching the 1999 Coppa Italia Final. The following season was rather disappointing in Serie A, with Fiorentina finishing in 7th place, but Trapattoni led them to some historic results in the Champions League, beating Arsenal 1–0 at the old Wembley Stadium and Manchester United 2–0 in Florence.

2000–2004: Italy national team
In July 2000, Trapattoni took charge of the Italy national football team after the resignation of Dino Zoff. He led the team to the 2002 FIFA World Cup, qualifying undefeated to that tournament.

Prior to the tournament, Trapattoni was surrounded by controversy after he omitted fan favourite Roberto Baggio – who had recently recovered from injury – from Italy's final 23-man squad, as he believed that the player was not yet fully fit. Italy were drawn in Group G of the tournament with Ecuador, Croatia and Mexico. They won their first match, beating Ecuador 2–0, but then suffered a surprise 2–1 defeat at the hands of Croatia. In their final group game, Italy drew 1–1 with Mexico, securing qualification to the Round of 16 with a second-place finish in their group, where they faced tournament co-hosts South Korea. Italy lost 2–1 and were eliminated from the World Cup, conceding an equaliser two minutes from full-time and losing in extra time with Ahn Jung-Hwan scoring the golden goal. The game was highly controversial with members of the Italian team, most notably Trapattoni and forward Francesco Totti, suggesting a conspiracy to eliminate Italy from the competition. Trapattoni even obliquely accused FIFA of ordering the official to ensure a South Korean victory so that one of the two host nations would remain in the tournament. The most contentious decisions were an early penalty awarded to South Korea (saved by Gianluigi Buffon), a golden goal by Damiano Tommasi ruled offside, and the sending off of Totti, who received a second yellow card for an alleged dive in the penalty area, all ruled by the referee Byron Moreno. Following the team's exit, Italy were criticised in the Italian and International press for their poor performance and ultra-defensive playing style under Trapattoni, who also came under fire in the Italian media for his tactics, which included initially refusing to play two of the team's star playmakers – Alessandro Del Piero and Francesco Totti – alongside one another during the tournament, and substituting a forward – Del Piero – for a holding midfielder – Gennaro Gattuso – in the second half of Italy's round of 16 match, in order to attempt to defend their 1–0 lead against South Korea.
 
Italy went on to secure qualification for UEFA Euro 2004 easily, but once again failed to impress at the tournament itself. They were drawn in Group C with Denmark, Sweden and Bulgaria. They drew 0–0 with Denmark and 1–1 with Sweden, beating Bulgaria 2–1 in their final group game. This led to an unexpected early exit from the tournament, despite Italy being undefeated. Denmark and Sweden drew in the group's final match, eliminating Italy who finished in third place of Group C, on account of goal difference. More specifically, Sweden, Denmark and Italy all finished with five points, with each team having defeated Bulgaria but drawn their two other games. As all results between the three teams in question were draws, both the points won in these games and the goal difference accrued in these games still left the teams undivided. The decisive tiebreaker was therefore the goals scored during the games between one another: Italy, having scored the fewest goals of the three teams, were therefore eliminated.

Trapattoni later said: "Sweden against Denmark, I remember the game. Do you know what Johansson [the then UEFA president Lennart Johansson] said? 'If this game finishes in a draw, we will open an investigation' Do you know if he made the investigation? I'm still waiting for the investigation." These comments came eight years later, in 2012.

Marcello Lippi replaced Trapattoni on 15 July 2004.

2004–2008: Benfica, Stuttgart, and Red Bull Salzburg
On 5 July 2004, Trapattoni was named as new coach of Benfica. He led them to the 2004–05 Portuguese league title, which was the club's first in 11 years. Benfica also reached the Portuguese Cup final that season, but lost to Vitória de Setúbal. Trapattoni resigned after the end of the 2004–05 season, saying he wanted to be closer to his family (in the north of Italy).

Trapattoni returned to management in the German Bundesliga in June 2005, by signing at VfB Stuttgart. However, during his 20 games at the helm, Stuttgart produced poor results. Denmark internationals Jon Dahl Tomasson and Jesper Grønkjær openly criticised their coach, claiming he was afraid to attack. Trapattoni immediately responded by dropping both players to the bench. With the atmosphere in the team worsening, he was sacked after just seven months, on 9 February 2006, reportedly for "not fulfilling the ambitions of the club". He was replaced as manager by Armin Veh.

In May 2006, Red Bull Salzburg announced they had signed Trapattoni as their new manager and Director of Football, along with one of his former players, Lothar Matthäus, who was to serve as Trapattoni's co-manager. Trapattoni initially cast doubt on this report, claiming he had not signed any contract. But three days later, both he and Matthäus signed and made their hirings official. As he had done with Benfica in Portugal two years before, Trapattoni managed to deliver instantly, winning the league title after a long period of failures for the club; he secured the 2006–07 Austrian Bundesliga, which was Salzburg's first in 10 years. At the end of the season, the club's board of directors unanimously decided to dismiss Matthäus, and Thorsten Fink became Trapattoni's assistant manager.

2008–2013: Republic of Ireland national team

On 11 February 2008, Trapattoni "agreed in principle" to take over the Republic of Ireland manager's job, but finished the season with Red Bull before taking up the Irish position on 1 May. Former Ireland midfielder Liam Brady was expected to be part of the Italian's backroom staff, while Marco Tardelli was confirmed as Trapattoni's assistant manager. Trapattoni signed Brady back in 1980 for Juventus from Arsenal for just over £500,000. Red Bull Salzburg confirmed, on 13 February 2008, that at the end of the 2007–08 season, Trapattoni would be leaving the club to take over as the Republic of Ireland manager. Manuela Spinelli became Trapattoni's interpreter. Because of her ability to speak both Italian and English, she became a familiar sight alongside him during most interviews. She also appeared on The Late Late Show without Trapattoni.

Trapattoni's first game in charge, a friendly against Serbia on 24 May 2008, ended in a 1–1 draw. His second, another friendly, against Colombia five days later, meant his first victory with the national side, 1–0. This was followed by a 1–1 draw with Norway, his first competitive win against Georgia and a draw with Montenegro in 2010 FIFA World Cup qualification.

Trapattoni's first defeat came in a friendly against Poland on 19 November 2008, a 3–2 loss at Croke Park. He also managed to claim a 1–1 away draw against 2006 FIFA World Cup champions Italy, that he had managed himself from 2000 to 2004, thanks to a late equaliser from Robbie Keane. He finished the qualifying campaign unbeaten, becoming only the third Irish manager to do so, qualifying for a playoff place for the 2010 World Cup.

In September 2009, he signed a new contract with Ireland that would have seen him continue as manager until UEFA Euro 2012. In the first leg of the World Cup playoff in Croke Park on 14 November 2009, France won 1–0 with a goal by Nicolas Anelka. In the second leg in Paris, on 18 November 2009, a goal from Robbie Keane levelled the aggregate scores at 1–1 in the first half. In extra time, however, a William Gallas equaliser put France through 2–1 on aggregate. Replays of the French goal showed that Thierry Henry had twice used his hand to control the ball and was in an offside position before crossing for Gallas to head home.	

In May 2011, he managed Ireland as they won the Nations Cup, after a 1–0 win against Scotland. Later that year he managed the Ireland national team to UEFA Euro 2012 qualification, following a 5–1 aggregate play-off win against Estonia. Trapattoni was rewarded with a new two-year contract by the Football Association of Ireland (FAI). His success was praised by, among others, Dietmar Hamann.

Ireland exited UEFA Euro 2012 at the group stage, after losing to eventual finalists Spain and Italy. Early in 2014 FIFA World Cup qualification, Ireland suffered a 6–1 defeat to Germany at home with a severely depleted team available. On 29 May 2013, Trapattoni's Ireland side faced off against England for the first time in eighteen years at Wembley Stadium in a match which ended 1–1. Trapattoni parted ways with the Republic of Ireland national team on 11 September 2013 by mutual consent, after a defeat by Austria effectively ended their chances of qualification for the 2014 World Cup.

Vatican City
Trapattoni has managed the Vatican City national football team which is a member of neither FIFA nor UEFA. His first match as manager was played on 23 October 2010 when Vatican City faced a team composed of Italian financial police. Previously, at the age of 71 Trapattoni was quoted as saying, "When I retire, I would like to become coach of the Vatican."

S. Pietro e Paolo Desio

In 2015, Trapattoni was symbolically appointed S. Pietro e Paolo Desio's manager during the related patronal feast.

Personal life
Trapattoni comes from a working-class background and lost his father as a child. A devout Roman Catholic, he regularly attends Regina Pacis Church in his hometown of Cusano Milanino whenever he is home and is a cooperator of Opus Dei. He and his wife Paola have a son and a daughter and are grandparents.

Health
In August 2010, Trapattoni was admitted to a hospital in Dublin, one-day before Ireland's friendly with Argentina. It was initially believed that the shellfish he had eaten before arriving in the country was to blame for him feeling unwell. He underwent surgery in the Mater Misericordiae University Hospital, Dublin on 11 August. He missed the Argentina game due to his surgery. In January 2011, reports in the Italian media, claimed that he was at home recovering from a mild stroke he suffered during surgery on 28 December 2010. The reports claimed that the stroke had caused partial paralysis on the right side of his body. In a statement released through the FAI, Trapattoni said that while he did have scheduled surgery in Italy over Christmas, he had not suffered a stroke.

Style of management

Considered one of the greatest and most successful managers of all time, Trapattoni is highly regarded for his man-management, motivational and organisational abilities, as well as his tactical acumen, being referred to in international media as "the King of Catenaccio" or the "Old Fox". He is known in particular for his direct management style and use of rigorous, innovative tactics, while his teams are usually known for their mental strength, organisation, and use of prepared set plays; Trapattoni was the main author and practitioner of the "zona mista" style of play (or "Gioco all'Italiana"), which was regarded as an evolution of the more traditional and defensive-minded Catenaccio system, which had been popularised in Italy by one of his major influences as a manager, Nereo Rocco; Rocco's tactics mainly focussed on sitting back and defending, and subsequently scoring on counter-attacks with few touches after winning back the ball. The zona mista tactical system came to be known as such as it instead drew elements from both man-marking strategies – such as Italian catenaccio – and zonal marking systems – such as the Dutch total football; this tactical system dominated Italian football from the mid-1970s until the late 1980s, which saw the emergence of Arrigo Sacchi's high-pressing, offensive minded zonal marking system.

Although Trapattoni was known for his defensive minded approach as a manager, his teams often made use of a ball–playing sweeper or libero – with good technique, vision, and an ability to read the game –, who was responsible both for defending and starting attacking plays from the back, as well as a creative and skilful offensive playmaker in midfield behind the forwards. As such, his teams were known for their defensive strength and playing style, as well as their ability to score from counter-attacks. In 2014, Trapattoni attributed his success and tactical intelligence as a manager to his time playing in midfield throughout his playing career, which allowed him to understand both the offensive and defensive phases of the game. Throughout his career, he used several different formations, including a 4–4–2, a 4–3–1–2, 4–2–3–1, 3–4–1–2, and a 3–5–2, as well as his fluid zona mista system; the latter system made use of a sweeper, a man-marking centre-back – or stopper –, two full-backs, a defensive midfielder, a regista or attacking midfielder, a second striker, and two wingers behind a lone striker or centre-forward, although players would often switch positions in this system, with only the stopper having a fixed role.

Trapattoni was noted throughout his career for his ideological confrontations with more attack-minded managers he faced, most famously Johan Cruyff, a rivalry that started in their playing days, with Trapattoni remembering that, in order to stop Cruyff in a match between Italy and the Netherlands, he had to resort to "dirty" tactics, such as pulling at his shirt.

Trapattoni's tactics throughout his long and successful managerial career focused on some of the following themes:

 "A coach must train [the players] with simplicity and establish clear rules when building the team. This simplicity can be expressed through the formulation of a strategy with patterns and tactics based on the following principles: never haggle and delay excessively, pass the ball in depth to verticalise as quickly as possible, control the pace of the game, limit risks, mark behind the ball, use on-field tactical communication to help your players, be alert to the [opposing] team's weaknesses and strengths
 "The tactics must focus on the pressure to recover the ball and then quickly develop the offensive action"
 Ball possession isn't important in itself and sometimes it can be counter-productive "like a person who talks too much". It is better "to have 0% of the possession and 100% of the goals"
 Strong emphasis on training the team in set pieces and dead-ball situations
 Instead of looking for space in the wings, as many managers do, it is more effective to look to exploit spaces behind the opposing team's backline through quick "vertical play". By inviting the opponent's pressing, the team can then easily exploit the spaces and gaps behind the opponent's defence
  The central area of the pitch, towards which statistically most of the possession is directed, needs to be very well-covered. There, the aim is to cripple the opponent's game and prevail on crucial second balls, thus easily creating "vertical and violent offensive transitions"
 Strikers must be trained to become clinical finishers or "killers" in the mould of Paolo Rossi or Filippo Inzaghi
 Tactical discipline is necessary, but the special genius of standout players should also be encouraged and harnessed to the fullest, with Trapattoni citing his use of Michel Platini and Roberto Baggio as primary examples

Trapattoni is also a popular figure in Italy for his original press conference speeches and trademark quotes, one of the most famous being "don't say cat until you've got it in the bag". During his managerial stints abroad, his sense of humour, coupled with his difficulties with the local language, won him a significant amount of popularity with both fans and the press. His most memorable press conference took place while he was in charge of German club Bayern Munich.

He is also known for a two-fingered whistle he used to capture the attention of his players during games. He also brought a bottle of holy water during 2002 FIFA World Cup games when he was in charge of the Italy national team. He kept the same tradition while in charge of Benfica.

Career statistics

Player

Club

International

International goal
Scores and results list Italy's goal tally first.

Manager

Honours

Player

Club
AC Milan
 Serie A: 1961–62, 1967–68
 Coppa Italia: 1966–67
 European Cup: 1962–63, 1968–69
 European Cup Winners' Cup: 1967–68

Manager

Club
Juventus
 Serie A: 1976–77, 1977–78, 1980–81, 1981–82, 1983–84, 1985–86
 Coppa Italia: 1978–79, 1982–83
 European Cup: 1984–85
 UEFA Cup Winners' Cup: 1983–84
 UEFA Cup: 1976–77, 1992–93
 European Super Cup: 1984
 Intercontinental Cup: 1985

Inter
 Serie A: 1988–89
 Supercoppa Italiana: 1989
 UEFA Cup: 1990–91

Bayern Munich
 Bundesliga: 1996–97
 DFB-Pokal: 1997–98
 DFB-Ligapokal: 1997

Benfica
Primeira Liga: 2004–05

Red Bull Salzburg
 Austrian Bundesliga: 2006–07

International
Republic of Ireland
 Nations Cup: 2011

Individual
 AC Milan Hall of Fame
 Seminatore d'Oro: 1976–77, 1985
 Premio l'Allenatore dei Sogni: 1992
 Panchina d'Oro: 1997
 Champions of Europe plaque: 2006
European Football Coach of the Year: 1985, 1991
European Coach of the Season: 1984–85, 1992–93
 Philips Manager of the Year Award: 2012
 Italian Football Hall of Fame: 2012
ESPN 12th Greatest Manager of All Time: 2013
France Football 12th Greatest Manager of All Time: 2019
 World Soccer 19th Greatest Manager of All Time: 2013

See also
List of European Cup and UEFA Champions League winning managers
List of UEFA Cup Winners' Cup winning managers
List of UEFA Cup and Europa League winning managers
List of Intercontinental Cup winning managers
List of UEFA Super Cup winning managers
Zona mista

References

External links

Trapattoni's German website 

FAI Profile
UEFA Profile
Profile and Statistics on the FIGC website
Republic of Ireland Record

1939 births
Living people
Sportspeople from the Metropolitan City of Milan
Italian Roman Catholics
Italian footballers
Association football defenders
A.C. Milan players
S.S.D. Varese Calcio players
Serie A players
UEFA Champions League winning players
Olympic footballers of Italy
Italy international footballers
Footballers at the 1960 Summer Olympics
1962 FIFA World Cup players
Italian football managers
A.C. Milan managers
Juventus F.C. managers
Inter Milan managers
FC Bayern Munich managers
Cagliari Calcio managers
ACF Fiorentina managers
Italy national football team managers
S.L. Benfica managers
VfB Stuttgart managers
Republic of Ireland national football team managers
FC Red Bull Salzburg managers
Serie A managers
Bundesliga managers
Primeira Liga managers
Austrian Football Bundesliga managers
UEFA Champions League winning managers
UEFA Cup winning managers
2002 FIFA World Cup managers
UEFA Euro 2004 managers
UEFA Euro 2012 managers
Italian expatriate football managers
Italian expatriate sportspeople in Germany
Italian expatriate sportspeople in Portugal
Italian expatriate sportspeople in Austria
Italian expatriate sportspeople in Ireland
Expatriate football managers in Germany
Expatriate football managers in Portugal
Expatriate football managers in Austria
Expatriate football managers in the Republic of Ireland
Footballers from Lombardy